Alba FC is a football club in Somalia. They were Somali football champions in 1995.

Achievements 
1995 Somalia League champions

References

Football clubs in Somalia